Dubeczno  is a settlement in the administrative district of Gmina Hańsk, within Włodawa County, Lublin Voivodeship, in eastern Poland.

References

Dubeczno